This article lists potential candidates for the Democratic nomination for Vice President of the United States in the 2008 presidential election. After Illinois Senator Barack Obama became the Democratic Party's presumptive presidential nominee on June 3, 2008, Obama formed a small committee, made up of James A. Johnson (who stepped down after one week), Eric Holder and Caroline Kennedy, to help him select a running mate. Veteran Democratic lawyer and advisor James "Jim" Hamilton, of the firm Morgan, Lewis & Bockius, later replaced Johnson in vetting candidates.

Obama strongly considered Senator Evan Bayh and governors Tim Kaine and Kathleen Sebelius, but Obama ultimately decided to select Delaware Senator Joe Biden as his running mate. Obama would later name Sebelius as his Secretary of Health and Human Services, while Kaine would ultimately become Hillary Clinton's running mate in 2016. The Obama–Biden ticket would go on to defeat the Republican tickets of McCain–Palin in 2008 and Romney–Ryan in 2012. Coincidental to the presidential election, Biden was re-elected to a seventh term as Senator from Delaware.

In 2020, Biden would later be elected president in his own right, defeating incumbent president Donald Trump.

Shortlist

According to contemporaneous news sources, the following people were thought to be on Senator Obama's short list for Vice President:

Final days and announcement

In the final days leading up to the Democratic National Convention, four individuals were left on Obama's final list for Vice President: Joe Biden, Evan Bayh, Tim Kaine, and Kathleen Sebelius.

On August 22, the eve of Obama's scheduled unveiling of his running mate, NBC News reported that Bayh and Kaine had been informed that they were not chosen. Last minute controversy emerged as it was learned that Senator Hillary Clinton was never vetted for the position, when it was earlier thought that Sen. Barack Obama would consider her as he previously stated in various private and public reports. This led to several questions as to whether Clinton supporters would feel betrayed and would defuse the intensity in "dream ticket" scenarios.

That night, ABC News reported that the U.S. Secret Service had assumed protection of Biden, which was seen as a sign that he had been chosen as Obama's running mate. Just hours later, the Associated Press broke the news that Democratic Party officials had confided that Obama had in fact selected Biden as the vice-presidential nominee.

Obama's campaign manager David Plouffe later wrote in his book The Audacity to Win, which was published in November 2009, that Bayh had been a "coin toss" away from becoming Obama's running mate. Plouffe and David Axelrod had interviewed the finalists and Plouffe said that Bayh's answers were "substantively close to perfect, if cautiously so." He recalled that at the time of the interview he thought to himself, "there's no way this guy will color outside the lines... Bayh's up side and down side are probably the closest spread of the three", compared to Biden, who could "reach higher heights but could cause us real pain." As Obama approached a decision, he told Plouffe "it's a coin toss now between Bayh and Biden, but Kaine is still a distinct possibility." On August 17, Obama told Axelrod simply, "I've decided. It's Biden." It was later reported that Obama told Kaine, in breaking the news to him, "You are the pick of my heart, but Joe [Biden] is the pick of my head".

In 2020 Obama wrote in his memoir A Promised Land a slightly different account of the selection, not mentioning Bayh and stating that he had ultimately narrowed down the choice for his running mate to two individuals – Kaine and Biden. He stated "At the time, I was much closer to Tim". However Obama recalled that he and his advisers  Axelrod and Plouffe wondered if voters would accept a ticket of "two relatively young, inexperienced, and liberal civil rights attorneys" and ultimately Obama felt the contrast between him and Biden was a strength, and that Biden being older than Obama would reassure those voters who were concerned that Obama was too young to be President.

On August 23, 2008, via text message, the Obama campaign announced that the then-presumptive Democratic presidential nominee chose Senator Joe Biden as his vice-presidential running mate.

Media speculation of potential running mates

Members of Congress

Governors

Other individuals

Denied interest

See also
Barack Obama 2008 presidential campaign 
2008 Democratic Party presidential candidates
2008 Democratic Party presidential primaries
2008 Democratic National Convention
List of United States major party presidential tickets

References

Notes

Vice presidency of the United States
2008 United States presidential election
vice presidential candidate selection, 2008
Mark Warner
Hillary Clinton
Joe Biden
Tim Kaine
Evan Bayh
Chris Dodd
Al Gore
John Edwards
Barack Obama